Doctrine and Life is an Irish religious periodical published by the Dominican religious order. It was initially published from September 1946 as part of the Irish Rosary magazine. From February 1951 it was published as a separate periodical, under its founding editor Fr. Anselm Moynihan. From 1951 to 1961 it was published bimonthly, before becoming a monthly publication in January 1961.

Prominent Irish priest Fr Austin Flannery O.P., became its second editor in 1957, editing it up until 1988. It is now published ten times a year and the present editor (and a director of Dominican Publications) is Fr. Bernard Treacy, O.P.

Other contributors have included David Begg, Liz Murphy RSM, Dr. Thomas O'Loughlin, Rebecca Roberts and Dr. Thomas R. Whelan CSSp.

See also
 Dominicans in Ireland

References

Catholic magazines
Magazines published in the Republic of Ireland